Branchia is a genus of ammotrechid camel spiders, first described by Martin Hammond Muma in 1951.

Species 
, the World Solifugae Catalog accepts the following three species:

 Branchia angustus Muma, 1951 — US (Arizona, California)
 Branchia brevis Muma, 1951 — US (Arizona, Texas)
 Branchia potens Muma, 1951 — Mexico, US (California, Nevada, Utah)

References 

Arachnid genera
Solifugae